Holding Back the River is the second studio album released by Scottish pop rock quartet Wet Wet Wet. Released on 30 October 1989, the album, intentionally written as a lyrical follow-up to the band's debut album Popped In Souled Out, spawned the singles "Sweet Surrender", "Broke Away", "Hold Back the River" and "Stay With Me Heartache" and peaked at #2 on the UK Albums Chart.

Aside from the nine tracks found on the standard album, "How the Hell Did They Get There" appears as a hidden track on the CD and digital download versions, having previously been released as a B-side to the album's lead single, "Sweet Surrender". Outside of the UK, the album saw particular success in Australia, where it was certified Gold and re-released in the form of a limited edition coloured vinyl.

Track listing

Charts

References

1989 albums
Wet Wet Wet albums
Mercury Records albums